Arctic Village (1933) is a book written by Robert Marshall, an American forester, writer, and wilderness activist (1901-1939), about the Koyukuk River area and the town of Wiseman. He lived there for 15 months starting in 1930 while conducting research on tree growth near the Arctic Divide. Marshall referred to the people of the frontier village as "...the happiest civilization of which I have knowledge."

References

Books about Alaska
Culture of the Arctic
Books about the Arctic
American travel books